Mount Alexandra may refer to:

 Mount Alexandra (Canada), Canada
 Mount Alexandra (Antarctica)
 Mount Alexandra (Queensland), Australia
 Alexandra Peak, Vancouver Island, British Columbia, Canada